Măciuca is a commune located in Vâlcea County, Oltenia, Romania. It is composed of nine villages: Bocșa, Botorani, Ciocănari, Măciuceni, Măldărești, Oveselu (the commune centre), Popești, Ștefănești, and Zăvoieni.

Măciuca borders four other communes: Stănești to the north, Gușoeni to the east, Valea Mare to the south, and Fârtățești to the west.

References

Communes in Vâlcea County
Localities in Oltenia